Austin Prokop (February 22, 1921 – August 2, 1980) was an American fencer. He competed in the team foil event at the 1948 Summer Olympics.

References

External links
 

1921 births
1980 deaths
American male foil fencers
Olympic fencers of the United States
Fencers at the 1948 Summer Olympics
People from Tarrytown, New York